The Ap-41 process is an obsolete colour reversal process used generally until 1983 for photographic films such as Agfa CT18.  It is significantly different from other colour reversal processes such as Ektachrome and Kodachrome. 
Photographic film processes